Décarie or Decarie is a surname. Notable people with the surname include:

Ed Decarie, Canadian ice hockey player
Daniel-Jérémie Décarie (1836–1904), Canadian politician
Jérémie-Louis Décarie (1870–1927), Canadian lawyer, politician, and judge in the province of Quebec
Richard Décarie, Canadian Strategy Communication Consultant
Vianney Décarie (1917–2009), Canadian philosopher

See also
Décarie Autoroute, the section of Quebec Autoroute 15 between Turcot Interchange and Décarie Interchange on the Island of Montreal
Décarie Interchange, an expressway interchange on the Island of Montreal